This is a list of years in Polish television.

Twenty-first century

Twentieth century

See also 
 List of years in Poland
 Lists of Polish films
 List of years in television

Television
Television in Poland by year
Polish television